A Sambalpuri sari is a traditional handwoven bandha (ikat) sari (locally called "sambalpuri bandha" sadhi or saree) wherein the warp and the weft are tie-dyed before weaving. It is produced in the Sambalpur, Balangir, Bargarh, Boudh and Sonepur districts of Odisha, India. The sari is a traditional female garment in the Indian subcontinent consisting of a strip of unstitched cloth ranging from four to nine metres in length that is draped over the body in various styles.

Sambalpuri saris are known for their incorporation of traditional motifs like shankha (shell), chakra (wheel), phula (flower), all of which have deep symbolism with the native Odia colour red black and white represent true Odia Culture along with Lord Kaalia (Jagannatha)'s face colour, but the highpoint of these saris is the traditional craftsmanship of the 'Bandhakala', the Tie-dye art reflected in their intricate weaves, also known as Sambalpuri "Ikkat".  In this technique, the threads are first tie-dyed and later woven into a fabric, with the entire process taking many weeks. These saris first became popular outside the state when the late Prime Minister Indira Gandhi started wearing them. In the 1980s and 1990s they became popular across India. To provide protection to the weavers practicing this art, the handloom silk saris manufactured in Sambalpur and Berhampur (Berhampur Patta) in Odisha were included in the Government of India's Geographical Indications (GI) registry.

The Sambalpuri sari

The Sambalpuri sari is made from fabric woven on a hand-loom and is popular throughout India.  Varieties of the Sambalpuri sari include Sonepuri, Pasapali, Bomkai, Barpali, and Bapta saris, which are in high demand. Most of them have been named after their places of origin and are popularly known as Pata. Paintings on Tussar saris depicting Mathura Vijay, Raslila and Ayodhya Vijay owe their origin to ‘Raghurajpur patta paintings’.

Fabric and design 

Sambalpuri fabrics reflect an original style of craft known as Baandha. Traditionally, craftsmen created Baandhas with images of flora or fauna or with geometrical patterns. More recently, new types of Baandha depicting portrait, landscape and flower pods are being designed.
Baandha fabric is created using a tie-dye technique. The yarns are tied according to the desired patterns to prevent absorption of dyes, and then dyed. The yarns or set of yarns so produced is called 'Baandha'. The unique feature of this form of designing is that the designs are reflected almost identically on both sides of the fabric. Once the fabric is dyed it can never be bleached into another colour. This versatile technique enables a craftsman to weave colourful designs, patterns and images into a fabric capable of inspiring a thought or conveying a message. Thus Baandha can be defined as "A length of systematically arranged yarn, dyed according to a preconceived design in such a manner so as to enable a weaver to portray the design when the yarn is converted to a fabric through the process of weaving". It is believed that this art migrated to Western Odisha along with the Bhulia community who fled Northern India in the year 1192 AD after the fall of the Chouhan empire at the hands of the Mughals. Since then and up to the year 1925 it flourished in Western Odisha in a limited number of designs and in vegetable colours and consisted mostly of saris used by the womenfolk of the Odisha. These saris were known as 'Bhulia-Kapta'. The demand was limited, distress sale was common and the craftsmen lived in penury.

Development 

Today the Baandha fabric is popularly known by its geographical and cultural name Sambalpuri owing to the pioneering efforts of Sri Radhashyam Meher, who brought about a radical improvement in the skills of the craftsmen and the quality of the products. Other master craftsmen who contributed to the development of Sambalpuri textiles were Padmashree Kailash Chandra Meher, Padmashree Kunja Bihari Meher, Padmashree Chatrubhuja Meher and Padmashree Krutharth Acharya, Handloom Technologist Mr. Ramkrishna Meher (National Awardee) . Sambalpuri textiles today include furnishing materials, dress materials and saris in silk, cotton and mercerised cotton in a variety of colours and many different designs.  Baandha craftsmen are also masters of the 'extra warp' and 'extra weft' style of designing which can be seen in almost all forms of Baandha textiles. Radhashyam Meher also produced Khadi textiles using the Baandha art.

In 1926, Radhashyam designed the first handloom to weave textiles of ninety inches width.  This achievement made him the 'Parda agent' of the Government of Bihar for the production of furnishing materials.  Later, after the formation of the state of Odisha, he became the 'Parda agent' of the government of Odisha.  His dexterity in the Baandha art and his ability to motivate the weaving community in the region to improve their skills by providing the necessary training and incentives enabled the creation of new designs that received international fame and recognition.

Radhashyam Meher established his proprietary concern, named 'Utkal Parda Agency', at Sambalpur for the research, production and marketing of Sambalpuri textiles. Acknowledging Radhashyam Meher's unparalleled contribution to the growth and popularity of 'Baandha art', the Ministry of Textiles of the Government of India has sponsored textile exhibitions coinciding with his birth anniversary on 20 November and organised by the Director of Textiles of the Government of Odisha.

He also played an active role in the cooperative movement and organised the Meher Art Fabrics cooperative society Ltd and the Sambalpur Regional Cooperative Marketing Society Ltd. (RCMS) He was a member of the All India Handloom Board in the year 1953. Until his death he was always elected as the member of the Sambalpur Municipality.

Industry 

Roughly 16 km from the district headquarters of Sonepur, Sagarpali is a large village hosting around 500 bhulia (weaver) families.  This is one of the largest weaving villages in Sonepur, a bastion of the Sambalpuri sari. Other areas affluent with handloom weavers are Barpali, Tarbha, Bijepur, Patnagarh and Bargarh.

Important handloom clusters of Odisha

Further reading
 The Orissan art of weaving, by Kesabachandra Mehera, Publisher: Keshab Chandra Meher, 1995.
 Indian ikat textiles, V & A Museum Indian Art Series. by Rosemary Crill, Victoria and Albert Museum. V & A Publications, 1998. .

References

External links

 

Geographical indications in Odisha
Odia culture
Figured fabrics
Handloom sarees
Bargarh district
Subarnapur district
Tourist attractions in Sambalpur